What's Up Fox (also known as Foxy Lady) is a 2006 South Korean television series, starring Go Hyun-jung and Chun Jung-myung. It aired on MBC from September 20 to November 9, 2006 on Wednesdays and Thursdays at 21:55 for 16 episodes. The romantic comedy explores age differences in relationships, in particular between a thirty three woman and her best friend's brother who is nine years younger.

Plot
Go Byung-hee (Go Hyun-jung) is a 33-year-old woman working as a reporter for a third-rate magazine, but with the heart of a  24-year-old virgin girl. She frequently finds it hard to cope with the unexciting aspects of her life. She dreams of someday working for a company that she can be proud of, and of finding the man of her fantasies: someone her age who has a good educational background and is financially stable, who'll provide warm support when she needs it, and who'll go with her on a world tour in a campervan. One day, she gets into an accident with her friend Seung-hye's younger brother, Chul-soo (Chun Jung-myung), and begins to see him in a new light. Park Chul-soo is a 24-year-old high school graduate working as a mechanic at a car repair shop. Although Chul-soo does not seem to have much, he is filled with maturity and enjoys life by doing the things he loves: working as a mechanic and traveling. How many people actually find the love they dream of? Until they realize that true love is just around the corner, this couple continues to pursue this unique romantic relationship of "dating a friend's brother" and "dating my sister's friend."

Cast

Main characters
 Go Hyun-jung as Go Byung-hee
Reporter working for the magazine C'est Si Bon. 
 Chun Jung-myung as Park Chul-soo
Yoo Tae-woong as young Chul-soo
Mechanic at Ssing Ssing Auto Repair Shop. 
 Cho Yeon-woo as Bae Hee-myung
Urologist who writes an advice column for C'est Si Bon as a medical expert. 
 Kim Eun-joo as Go Jun-hee
Byung-hee's younger sister who is a second-rate fashion model. 
 Son Hyun-joo as Park Byung-gak
President of a luxury brand.

Supporting characters
Youn Yuh-jung as Choi Soon-nam (Byung-hee and Jun-hee's mother)
Ahn Sun-young as Park Seung-hye (Chul-soo's sister)
Park Byung-sun as Oh Pil-kyo (Soon-nam's real estate employee)
Kwon Hae-hyo as Hwang Yong-kil (magazine publisher)
Choi Yoon-jung as Jo Sung-ran
Seo Young as Joo-hee
Choi Woo-je as Sun-woo (Byung-hee's college friend)
Seo Hye-jin as Jo Hyun-jung (Byung-hee's co-worker)
Jung Ki-sung as Director Kim
Kim Hak-chul as an auto repair shop owner

Ratings
 In the table below, the blue numbers represent the lowest ratings and the red numbers represent the highest ratings.

Source: TNS Media Korea

International broadcast
It aired in Japan on cable channel KNTV from September 20 to November 9, 2006, and cable channel Wowow beginning April 19, 2007. In Philippines year 2007 to aired on GMA 7 with Filipino dubbed version under the title of Foxy Lady premiere July 9, 2007 – September 21, 2007 with the OST local title With a Smile song by Eraserheads.

References

External links
 What's Up Fox? official MBC website 
 Foxy Lady at MBC Global Media
 

Korean-language television shows
2006 South Korean television series debuts
2006 South Korean television series endings
MBC TV television dramas
South Korean romantic comedy television series